The 2016 Red Bull Ring GP3 Series round was a GP3 Series motor race held on 2 and 3 July 2016 at the Red Bull Ring in Austria. It was the second round of the 2016 GP3 Series. The race weekend supported the 2016 Austrian Grand Prix.

Background
Before the weekend commenced, Mahaveer Raghunathan announced that he would call time on his GP3 campaign to focus on his efforts in Auto GP. In the weekend's only practice session, Giuliano Alesi withdrew from the weekend after an accident which saw him unfit to complete the rest of the weekend.

Classification

Qualifying
It was a dominant session for the ART Grand Prix outfit with the top-three being Charles Leclerc, Alexander Albon and Nyck de Vries. Leclerc achieved a time of 1:19.071, half a second faster than his nearest competitor, Albon.

Race 1

Race 2

Standings after the round

Drivers' Championship standings

Teams' Championship standings

 Note: Only the top five positions are included for both sets of standings.

See also 
 2016 Austrian Grand Prix
 2016 Red Bull Ring GP2 Series round

References

External links 
 Official website of GP3 Series

|- style="text-align:center"
|width="35%"|Previous race:
|width="30%"|GP3 Series2016 season
|width="40%"|Next race:

GP3
Red Bull Ring
Red Bull Ring